The Courland Peninsula (German: Kurland) is a historical and cultural region in western Latvia in the north-western part of Courland. Fourteen coastal villages on the peninsula make of the Livonian core area.

It is bordered by the Baltic Sea in the West, the Irbe Strait in the North and the Gulf of Riga in the East. It covers northwestern Latvia.

The Courland Peninsula was the site of the Courland Pocket of World War II.

See also
 Courland Pocket

References 

Peninsulas of Europe
Courland